Hazel Ann Ghazarian Skaggs (August 26, 1920 - March 4, 2005)  was an American author, composer, and music educator who specialized in piano pedagogy.

Skaggs was born in Boston to Seeran Bardezbanian and Hagop Ghazarian. She married Paul Skaggs. 

Skaggs earned a pedagogy diploma from the New England Conservatory of Music; a B.A. and M.A. in psychology from Fairleigh Dickinson University; and an artist diploma from the American College of Musicians. She also studied at the Universities of Colorado, Minnesota, and Wisconsin. Her teachers included Dr. Clarence Adler, Howard Goding, Ernst Levy, and Gladys Ondricek.  

During her years at New England Conservatory, Skaggs wrote short stories for the Boston Post. She contributed to The Art of Teaching Piano (edited by Denes Agay), and wrote many articles for music journals (see below).

Skaggs was a deacon in the Armenian Presbyterian Church and enjoyed folk dancing as a hobby. She belonged to and held office in several professional organizations:

American Society of Composers, Authors, and Publishers (ASCAP) 

National Guild of Piano Teachers (national chair 1964-1992)

Piano Teachers Congress of New York City (president 1975-1979) 

Professional Music Teachers Guild of New Jersey (Board of Directors 1987).

The Professional Music Teachers Guild of New Jersey established the Hazel Ghazarian Skaggs Memorial Piano Competition which continues today. The Piano Teachers Congress presents Hazel Ghazarian Skaggs Awards to outstanding students.  

Skaggs’ music and writing were published by the Boston Music Company, Carl Fischer Music, Century Music Publishing Company, Schroeder & Gunther Inc., Summy Birchard, and the Willis Music Company. She composed some songs for soprano. Her articles and compositions for piano included:

Articles 

“A Hypothesis and a Look Inward” (Piano Quarterly) 

“A Plea for the Transfer Pupil” (Music Journal) 

“Decentralization in Music is Necessary!” (The Etude) 

“Group Piano Teaching” (Journal of the American Liszt Society) 

“How Can We Save the Beginner?” (Music Journal) 

“Is the Make Up Lesson Necessary?” (Music Journal Anthology) 

“Teachers Are Not Born” (Music Journal)

“What About Student Recitals?” (Music Journal)

Piano 

Flight to the Moon 

Impressions of Snow 

Little Blue Lady

Little Girl from Mars 

Merry Cricket 

Petite Ballerina 

Phantom Waltz

Polka Dot Clown
Prelude and Fugue 
Sonata 

Spring Showers 

Thumbs Under (exercise book)

Toccatina

References 

American women composers
1920 births
2005 deaths
American writers
American music educators
People from Boston
New England Conservatory alumni
Fairleigh Dickinson University alumni